Jan Kamphuysen, Camphuysen, or Kamphuijsen (1760 – 1841) was a painter from the Northern Netherlands.

He was born in Amsterdam where he became a pupil of the theatre decorator Pieter Barbiers. Like his teacher, he is known for his interior decorations as well as landscapes and historical allegories.

Kamphuysen died in Amsterdam.

References

Jan Kamphuijsen in Roeland van Eynden and Adriaan van der Willigen'Geschiedenis der vaderlandse schilderkunst
Jan Kamphuysen on artnet

1760 births
1841 deaths
Painters from Amsterdam
18th-century Dutch painters
18th-century Dutch male artists
Dutch male painters
19th-century Dutch painters
19th-century Dutch male artists